Donald Southgate (31 October 1924 – 12 February 2005) was a British historian of nineteenth century British political history.

He studied for his PhD at Christ Church, Oxford, where he was also president of the Conservative Association. He then taught at Exeter University, Rhodes University in South Africa, Glasgow University and Queen's College, Dundee. He was appointed reader at Queen's College in 1968 and was dean of the faculty of arts during 1976–77.

Works
The Passing of the Whigs, 1832–1886 (London: Macmillan, 1962).
‘The Most English Minister...’ The Policies and Politics of Palmerston (London: Macmillan, 1966).
(editor), The Conservative Leadership, 1832–1932 (London: Macmillan, 1974).
University Education in Dundee: A Cenetary History (Edinburgh: Published for the University of Dundee by Edinburgh University Press, 1982).

Notes

1924 births
2005 deaths
Alumni of Christ Church, Oxford
20th-century British historians
Academics of the University of Dundee